Wyer is a surname. Notable persons with that name include:

Doug Wyer (born 1947), English speedway rider
John Wyer (1909–1989), automobile racing engineer and team manager
Reginald Wyer (1898–1970), British cinematographer
Russell Wyer, Australian rugby league player

See also
Wijer
Wyers